Kelsi N. Singer (born 1984), Ph.D., is an American planetary scientist and senior research scientist at the Southwest Research Institute (SwRI) in Boulder, CO. She is a co-investigator and deputy project scientist of NASA's New Horizons mission studying the geomorphology and geophysics of the Pluto system and of Arrokoth (2014 MU69).

Education 
Singer received a Bachelor's in Astronomy and Anthropology from the University of Colorado Boulder. While there, she decided to pursue research in the fields of astrobiology and planetary science. She studied abroad at Macquarie University in Sydney, Australia during her undergrad, where she worked at the Australian Centre for Astrobiology. Upon returning to Boulder, she worked with Steve Mojzsis on her honors thesis project about using cyclic rhythmites as a way to trace the length of a day over millions of years. She received her Ph.D. in Earth and Planetary Science, Icy Satellite Tectonic, Geodynamic, and Mass Wasting Surface Features: Constraints on Interior Processes and Evolution, in 2013 from Washington University in St. Louis.

Research 
Singer continued as a postdoctoral researcher at Washington University after receiving her Ph.D. In 2014, she joined the New Horizons team at SwRI as a postdoctoral researcher, where she studies the geophysics of Kuiper Belt Objects, particularly cratering physics. At SwRI, she is a senior research scientist and Deputy Project Scientist for the New Horizons Extended Mission.

In 2019, Singer and her team demonstrated from images of craters taken by New Horizons' Long Range Reconnaissance Imager (LoRRI) that small Kuiper Belt Objects (less than one mile in diameter) are rare. The results place constraints on formation and evolution models of the Solar System, suggesting that objects in the Kuiper Belt formed from rapidly collapsing dust clouds rather than incremental collisions of larger debris.

Singer has coordinated and contributed to the 'Women in Planetary Science' blog site since 2009. She has also contributed articles for the Planetary Society's website.

Awards and honors 
Singer received the American Astronomical Society (AAS) Division of Planetary Science (DPS) Harold C. Urey Prize in 2019, which recognizes outstanding achievements in planetary science by early career researchers. Asteroid 10698 Singer was named in her honor. The naming was published by the Minor Planet Center on 13 April 2017 (M.P.C.103977).

References 

Planetary scientists
Women planetary scientists
American women scientists
New Horizons
Washington University in St. Louis alumni
University of Colorado Boulder alumni
Living people
1984 births